Smithfield Masonic Lodge, also known as the Brooks Building, is a historic Masonic Lodge located at Smithfield, Johnston County, North Carolina, United States It is believed to be built in about 1854, and had moved to its present location in 1915–1917. It is a two-story, three bay, rectangular vernacular Greek Revival style frame building. It has a gable front temple form and is sheathed in plain weatherboard.  Fellowship Lodge No. 84 occupied the building until the 1940s, and the Smithfield Woman's Club met in the building from 1917 through 1933. The building house Smithfield's first public library operated by the Smithfield Woman's Club.

It was listed on the National Register of Historic Places in 2007.

References

Buildings and structures completed in 1854
Buildings and structures in Smithfield, North Carolina
Clubhouses on the National Register of Historic Places in North Carolina
Former Masonic buildings in North Carolina
Greek Revival architecture in North Carolina
National Register of Historic Places in Johnston County, North Carolina